Karmir in Armenian (or Garmir in Western Armenian) means red. It may also refer to:

Karmir Aghek, a village in the Lori Province of Armenia
Karmir-Astkh, a rural locality (a khutor) in Kuzhorskoye Rural Settlement of Maykopsky District, in the Adygea Republic of Russia
Karmir-Blur or Teishebaini, a capital of the Transcaucasian provinces of the ancient kingdom of Urartu
Karmir Gyugh or Karmirgyugh, a major village in the Gegharkunik Province of Armenia
Karmir Kar or Qızılqaya, Kalbajar, a village in the Kalbajar Rayon of Azerbaijan
Karmir-Kulali also, Kulali, a town in the Tavush Province of Armenia
Karmir Shuka or Qirmizi Bazar, a village in the Khojavend Rayon of the Nagorno-Karabakh region in Azerbaijan (de facto Artsakh Republic)
Karmir Vank, or Artsvanik, a village and rural community (municipality) in the Syunik Province of Armenia

See also
Vordan karmir or Armenian cochineal, a scale insect indigenous to the Ararat plain and Aras (Araks) River valley in the Armenian Highlands. Formerly used to produce an eponymous crimson carmine dyestuff known in Armenia as vordan karmir (literally "worm's red") and historically in Persia as kirmiz.
Verin Karmir aghpyur or Verin Karmiraghbyur, a town in the Tavush Province of Armenia
Garmirian or Paul Garmirian (cigar brand) or P.G, a cigar brand named after its founder, Armenian-American cigar connoisseur Paul Garmirian